Bronzini is an Italian surname. Notable people with the surname include:

 Giorgia Bronzini (born 1983), Italian cyclist
 Giovanni Battista Bronzini (1925–2002), Italian anthropologist and historian
 Pietro Bronzini (1898–1962), Italian footballer
 Teodoro Bronzini (1888–1981), Argentine politician

See also
 European seabass, also known as Bronzini

Italian-language surnames